Jaap Speyer (1891–1952) was a Dutch film director. He was married to the German actress Mia Pankau.

Selected filmography

 Hedda's Revenge (1919)
 Entblätterte Blüten (1920)
 Colombine (1920)
 Die rote Nacht (1921)
 King of Women (1923)
 Jimmy: The Tale of a Girl and Her Bear (1923)
 Der allmächtige Dollar (1923)
 The Flower Girl of Potsdam Square (1925)
 The Doll of Luna Park (1925)
 The Elegant Bunch (1925)
 The Morals of the Alley (1925)
 The Three Mannequins (1926)
 White Slave Traffic (1926)
 Valencia (1927)
 Bigamie (1927)
 Hotelratten (1927)
 Liebeshandel (1927)
 The Schorrsiegel Affair (1928)
 Miss Chauffeur (1928)
 Die drei Frauen von Urban Hell (1928)
 Tales from the Vienna Woods (1928)
 Ein kleiner Vorschuß auf die Seligkeit (1929)
 Jennys Bummel durch die Männer (1929)
 Retreat on the Rhine (1930)
 Tingel-Tangel (1930)
 Tänzerinnen für Süd-Amerika gesucht (1931)
 Moritz Makes his Fortune (1931)
 Kampf um Blond (1933)
 The Tars (1934)
 Malle Gevallen (1934)
 De Familie van mijn Vrouw (1935)
 Kermisgasten (1936)
 Op een Avond in Mei (1937)
 A Kingdom For a Horse (1949)

Bibliography

External links

1891 births
1952 deaths
Dutch film directors
German-language film directors
Mass media people from Amsterdam
University of Amsterdam alumni